Surry Mountain Lake is a  impoundment on the Ashuelot River in Cheshire County in southwestern New Hampshire, United States, in the town of Surry.

The reservoir was built to protect downstream communities, such as Keene, from flooding. Surry Mountain Dam was built by the United States Army Corps of Engineers in 1941 as an earthen rock-fill structure. Both dam and reservoir are owned by the Corps of Engineers.

The lake is classified as a warmwater fishery, with observed species including rainbow trout, brown trout, smallmouth and largemouth bass, chain pickerel, horned pout, and black crappie.

See also

List of lakes in New Hampshire

References

Lakes of Cheshire County, New Hampshire
Reservoirs in New Hampshire
Protected areas of Cheshire County, New Hampshire
Dams in New Hampshire
United States Army Corps of Engineers dams
Dams completed in 1941
Surry, New Hampshire